The 1953 Hayes and Harlington by-election was held on 1 April 1953 after the resignation of the Labour MP Walter Ayles.  It was won by the Labour candidate Arthur Skeffington.

References

Hayes and Harlington,1953
Hayes and Harlington, 1953
Hayes and Harlington by-election
1953 elections in the United Kingdom
20th century in Middlesex
April 1953 events in the United Kingdom